Charles W. Baker High School is a public high school located in Baldwinsville, Onondaga County, New York, U.S.A., and is the only high school operated by the Baldwinsville Central School District.

The school was named after Charles Winston Baker.

Footnotes

Schools in Onondaga County, New York
Public high schools in New York (state)